Silvermont is a historic home located at Brevard, Transylvania County, North Carolina.  It was built in 1916–1917, and is a two-story, five bay, Colonial Revival style brick dwelling with a gambrel roof.  Also on the property is a one-story, stone veneer cottage.  It has a rear ell, two-story front portico supported by columns with Corinthian order capitals, one-story wraparound porch, porte cochere, and sunroom.  The house and grounds were donated to Transylvania County in 1972, and serve as a public recreation center.

It was listed on the National Register of Historic Places in 1981. It is located in the East Main Street Historic District.

References

Houses on the National Register of Historic Places in North Carolina
Colonial Revival architecture in North Carolina
Houses completed in 1917
Houses in Transylvania County, North Carolina
National Register of Historic Places in Transylvania County, North Carolina
Historic district contributing properties in North Carolina